Teemu Virtala (born August 17, 1983) is a Finnish ice hockey player. He is currently playing with SV Kaltern in the Italian Hockey League.

Virtala played with KalPa in the Finish SM-liiga during the 2007–08 and 2008–09 seasons. In 2014 he joined Kazzinc-Torpedo and a year later was transferred to Arlan Kokshetau.

References

External links

1983 births
Living people
Arlan Kokshetau players
Finnish expatriate ice hockey players in Austria
Finnish expatriate ice hockey players in Denmark
Finnish expatriate ice hockey players in Italy
Finnish expatriate ice hockey players in Kazakhstan
Finnish expatriate ice hockey players in Norway
Finnish ice hockey centres
Gentofte Stars players
Hokki players
KalPa players
Kazzinc-Torpedo players
People from Uusikaupunki
Rødovre Mighty Bulls players
Sportspeople from Southwest Finland
Stavanger Oilers players
SV Kaltern players